Unity Aerodrome  is located adjacent to Unity, Saskatchewan, Canada.

See also 
 List of airports in Saskatchewan

References

Registered aerodromes in Saskatchewan